Plankington Bluff is a large rock bluff along the southwest edge of Mackin Table, 5 nautical miles (9 km) southeast of Shurley Ridge, in the Patuxent Range, Pensacola Mountains. Mapped by United States Geological Survey (USGS) from surveys and U.S. Navy air photos, 1956–66. Named by Advisory Committee on Antarctic Names (US-ACAN) for John C. Plankington, Jr., meteorologist at South Pole Station, winter 1967.

Cliffs of Queen Elizabeth Land